The Angola Davis Cup team represents Angola in Davis Cup tennis competition and are governed by the Federação Angolana de Tenis.  They have not competed since 2003.

History
Angola competed in its first Davis Cup in 2001.  Their best result was 7th in Group III in 2003.

Current team (2022) 

 Zidario Quitomina
 Fernando Andre
 Cleuson Tipewa
 Joao Neves

See also
Davis Cup

External links

Davis Cup teams
Davis Cup
Davis Cup